New Trier High School (also known as New Trier Township High School or NTHS) is a public four-year high school, with its main campus for sophomores through seniors located in Winnetka, Illinois, United States, and a campus in Northfield, Illinois, with freshman classes and district administration. Founded in 1901, the school serves the Chicago suburbs of Wilmette, Kenilworth, Winnetka, Glencoe, and Northfield as well as portions of Northbrook, Glenview, and unincorporated Cook County. New Trier's seal depicts the Porta Nigra, a symbol of Trier, Rhineland-Palatinate, Germany. The athletic teams are known as the Trevians, an archaic demonym for the people of Trier.

Student demographics
In the 2021-22 academic year, New Trier had an enrollment of 2,995 students in grades 10-12, and a student-teacher ratio of 11.7 to 1. Most of the students come from middle or upper class families, with 3% of students from poor households (measured by how many qualify for  free/reduced-price lunch).

The majority of students identify as white (77 percent), while 10 percent are Asian, 7 percent are Hispanic, and 5 percent are multiracial. Less than one percent of the student body is Black, American Indian, Alaska Native, or Native Hawaiian/Pacific Islander.

On the freshman campus, there were 894 students enrolled in 2021-22. The student-teacher ratio is somewhat lower, at 10.5 to 1. Demographically, the student body is similar to the main campus: 75 percent of students are white, 10 percent Asian, 9 percent Hispanic, and 6 percent multiracial, with members of other groups accounting for less than 1 percent. Three percent of students come from households where income is below the income threshold for subsidized school lunch.

History 

New Trier High School opened its doors for the first time on February 4, 1901, welcoming 76 students. In 1913, it became the first American high school with an indoor swimming pool.

In 1920, the inaugural edition of The New Trier News was published. In 1934, the track and field team won the school's first IHSA state championship (as of 2023, New Trier leads all Illinois high schools in the number of athletic state championships). In 1965, the New Trier West Campus (which, as of 2023, serves the school's freshman students) was opened in the village of Northfield.

In the 1950s, New Trier became the first American high school with an educational, non-commercial FM broadcast license for a radiated station (WNTH, 88.1 FM). By 1970 New Trier was home to the nation's first public high school-based CCTV instructional station, ITV, which broadcast educational programming to township elementary schools via microwave signals. Students operated WNTH under a faculty advisor, ITV was operated by students under professional television technical and programming staff.

By 1962, student enrollment was more than 4,000. Some 20 "temporary" trailer classrooms lined the rear of the building, which had been designed for 3,000. To accommodate the growing baby boomer student body, voters approved a referendum for New Trier to purchase forty-six acres of land in Northfield. Chicago architecture firm Perkins and Will was selected to design a campus of curricular buildings clustered around a central library and administration building. The resulting modernist design was widely noted in secondary education architecture literature and practice, and emulated by Winnetka's Carleton Washburne junior high school several years later.

"New Trier West" opened to freshmen and sophomores in 1965. What had been "New Trier," at 385 Winnetka Avenue in Winnetka, became "New Trier East." In 1967, New Trier West was dedicated as a separate four-year high school. U.S. Secretary of Health, Education and Welfare John Gardner keynoted the dedication, which was also attended by U.S. Senator Charles Percy ('37), and Congressman Donald Rumsfeld ('50).

Enrollment reached an all-time peak of 6,558 students in 1972. By 1981, enrollment had dropped significantly. As a result, the school board decided to combine the East and West schools and convert New Trier West into the freshman-only campus. The division of freshmen (at the former New Trier West) from upperclassmen (at the former New Trier East) lasted from September 1981 until June 1985. By then enrollment had declined enough for the board to bring all students under one roof, close the former New Trier West, and convert the Northfield campus into a community recreation space. The campus later housed a senior center, corporate dormitories, a public swimming pool, and an alternative high school program known as West Center Academy.

The 1987-88 New Trier School Board proposed selling the New Trier West Campus in Northfield to facilitate a $10–12 million renovation project at the East Campus. Their decision to sell the property was based on a demographers report and a reluctance to raise property taxes to cover the NT East revamp. The demographer, however, expressed caution about relying on predictions that exceeded a 10-year span stating in part that ". . .after 10 years, greater risk emerges of unanticipated events invalidating even the most scientifically-based projection methods." Concerned about another spike in (school) population and the need to retain the 42.5 acre Campus for future generations, local citizen advocates formed "The Coalition for the Future of New Trier". In March 1988 the Coalition forced the issue to referendum which, backed by broad community support, resulted in a successful ratification of the Coalition's position. The Campus was retained and subsequently rented to various entities until it was again needed as additional space for a growing NT student population. According to research it took less than two decades for the combined New Trier enrollment to exceed 4,000 students. The Coalition has never been acknowledged publicly for their significant role as a catalyst in retaining the 42.5-acre New Trier West Campus.

New Trier was featured in the December 9, 1996, issue of Time in an article entitled "High Times at New Trier High." Among other claims, the article stated that "New Trier kids who smoke pot" were "by all accounts more than three-fifths of the student body," compared with national averages at the time closer to 33%. However, on the school's WNTH's radio program, the writer acknowledged that the "three-fifths" claim had been inadvertently rewritten during the editing process in such a way that seemed to imply that more than 60% of New Trier students may be regular users of marijuana, whereas that figure should have been clearly labeled as the portion of students who had ever used marijuana, including many who had used it only once or twice 

In 2017, the school neared completion of a $104.9 million renovation and addition project at its East Campus, which replaced three aging buildings on the west side of the campus with the addition of a new student cafeteria, a new library, more than two dozen classrooms for core English, math, social studies, language and business program classes, new art labs, applied arts classroom spaces in the basement for STEM (science, technology, engineering, and math) programming, space for the school's radio and broadcasting programming, two green roofs, and two new theaters.

Jonathan Kozol wrote a book called Savage Inequalities in 1991 that discussed the harsh conditions in the poorest school districts in the United States, making a correlation between inequality and racial separation and segregation. In the book, Kozol contrasted New Trier High School's spending per student to impoverished schools within Chicago.

In 2016, Newsweek magazine ranked New Trier as the top open-enrollment high school in Illinois and the 17th best high school in the country.

Administration
, the New Trier Township High School Board of Education's members are mostly from Glencoe and Wilmette. As of September 1, 2017, the current superintendent of New Trier Township High School District 203 is Dr. Paul Sally. He replaced Dr. Linda L. Yonke, the first woman to hold the position, at the end of June 2017.

Academics

Profile and recognition
In 2006, New Trier spent more than $15,000 yearly per student, well above the then state average of $8,786. It has been included in the "Top Hundred" and "Most Successful" lists of the National Association of Secondary School Principals, The New York Times, The Washington Post, and Parade magazine. The school was identified as "quite possibly the best public school in America" by Town & Country, in a six-page article on New Trier that cited the "rich" and "demanding" curriculum, extensive arts and activities, strong participation in athletics, and faculty of the caliber typically found teaching at good colleges. Life also recognized New Trier as one of the best high schools in America with cover stories in 1950 and 1998.

In the class of 2017, 23 students were National Merit finalists, 27 were National Merit semifinalists, 71 received letters of commendation and 442 were Illinois State Scholars. For this same class, the average composite ACT score was 27.8, the highest in Illinois for an open enrollment public school and among the top school scores in the United States. The class of 2018 scored an average 28.0 composite on the ACT, the highest ever for New Trier, and the highest in Illinois for open enrollment schools. According to an article by the University of Michigan Department of Psychology, "New Trier students outperform their Illinois classmates on every conceivable measure." The article also points out that 92% of the school's funding comes from the high property taxes of its affluent surroundings. Approximately 98% of the class of 2014 went on to enroll in college.

New Trier ensembles or individuals have received 39 awards in the Downbeat Student Music Awards program. A record-setting seven of these were achieved in 2007 alone. More than 1,100 students participate in the music department. The student-run Soundtraks Club produces all 24 concerts a year, webcast live on the internet at ntjazz.com, on local cable television, and in stereo on WNTH radio.

New Trier was named a Grammy Signature School Gold recipient by the Grammy Foundation in 2000 for its commitment to music education, and was named the National Signature School in 2007 as the nation's top high school music program. In April 2006, the school's Concert Choir and Symphony Orchestra performed in New York City at Carnegie Hall. In the summer of 2000, the school's Jazz Ensemble, Chamber Orchestra and Bluegrass Band enjoyed a successful two-week concert tour of China.

Subject levels 
New Trier has practiced subject-level grouping for over fifty years. In this system, up to four different levels of difficulty are offered for each academic subject. Level 2E is considered a general level. Levels 2, 3 and 4 are college preparatory, honors, and high honors levels, respectively. Level 5 was reserved for Advanced Placement classes and other college-level classes, such as multivariable calculus and linear algebra, but the level was phased out beginning with the class of 2011. (All 5-level courses are currently counted as 4-level.) Students may work at different levels in different subjects. Other levels include 8 and 9. Level 8 classes are counted for elective credit and level 9 classes, a combination of level 2, 3, and 4 students (i.e. 2+3+4=9) are graded as level 3 classes.

New Trier offers both unweighted and weighted grade point averages (GPA), and plus and minus grades are reported on transcripts. In calculating a weighted GPA, grades in a student's coursework are given different values depending on the level in which the grade is earned. For example, an "A" in a 2-level course is weighted at 4.00, while in levels 3 and 4 the values are 4.67 and 5.33, respectively (an "A" in a 5-level AP class is worth 5.67). In 2009, New Trier announced that for the 2010–2011 school year the level 5 will be eliminated. A.P. classes will be weighted to level 4.

Student life

Athletics

With more than 120 state championships, New Trier High School currently has more than any other high school in Illinois. New Trier also leads the state in both boys' and girls' state titles. The sports in which New Trier has the most IHSA-sponsored state titles are boys' swimming and diving (24), boys' tennis (19), girls' swimming and diving (14), boys' golf (9), girls' tennis (9), and girls' badminton (8). New Trier has been strong in the sport of baseball, twice as state champions, winning in 2000 and 2009. New Trier has also historically been strong at non-IHSA sponsored sports, including 18 Great Lakes High School Fencing Conference (formerly Midwest High School Fencing) championships in men's fencing and 10 in women's fencing, fifteen state titles (Blackhawk Cup) in boys' ice hockey, twelve state championships in boys' lacrosse, 1995, 1998, 2005, 2006, 2007, 2008, 2009, 2010, 2011, 2014, 2015, 2017, 2019 six state titles in girls' ice hockey, six state titles in girls' golf (2000, 2001, 2002, 2003, 2010, 2012, 2017) and six runners up in girls' golf, 20 national championships in boys' rowing, 7 national championships in girls' rowing, nine state championships in girls' field hockey, six state championships in girls' lacrosse, and one state championship in girls' cross country. The top varsity ice hockey team for boys, New Trier Green, won the first ever USA Hockey High School National Championship title in 2010, and repeated as champions in 2011.

In May 2005, New Trier was ranked #12 in Sports Illustrateds list of the "Top 25 High School Sports Programs in America," and first in Illinois.

New Trier Swim Club 
The New Trier Swim Club (NTSC) is nationally recognized for swimming excellence and the development of young adult leaders in athletics and education. NTSC swimmers compete at the national level of swimming, including the 2004 and 2008 Olympic Trials. The NTSC has consistently placed in the top 5 of all teams in the state of Illinois, and has been recognized by USA Swimming as a Silver Medal Club for the past four years.

Activities
There are over 150 different extracurricular activities at New Trier, including the student-loved "Cereal Club".

Lagniappe-Potpourri
New Trier's Lagniappe-Potpourri is an annual student-written, student-choreographed, student-composed, student-directed, student-managed, student-built and student-performed variety show. The show began as two separate productions, Lagniappe and Potpourri, at the east and west campuses respectively. In 1981, the two campuses combined, causing the two shows to merge into Lagniappe-Potpourri.

Journalism 
New Trier has several student publications, including the New Trier Political Journal, Calliope, the school's art magazine and Logos, the school's literary magazine.

Debate
New Trier's debate program has flourished in recent years, with two students receiving the top speaker award at the Tournament of Champions, which only allows the top 72 teams in the nation to compete through a system of qualifiers. The school has also had teams placed in the top 16 in recent years. New Trier has had students either go to the final or win in the Illinois High School Association's state debate tournament in all four divisions, winning the 2011 and 2013 championship in Public Forum. In 2017 they won the championship in Lincoln-Douglas debate.

Philanthropy
Each of the four official class governments (Sophomore and Junior Steering Committees and the Freshman and Senior Senates) makes significant annual donations to various philanthropic causes throughout the community, state, country, and world. Every year since 2001, the Senior Senate has fully funded the construction of a house in conjunction with Habitat for Humanity of Lake County, Illinois, a non-profit organization that fights homelessness and substandard housing. A recent goal of the campaign was 10 houses in 10 years, and the class of 2010 fulfilled that goal. New Trier is the only school so far to build 10 houses with Habitat. Many fundraisers contribute to this and various other causes over the course of the academic year. The New Trier Tsunami Relief Committee donated more than $18,000 to relief organizations to save people who were affected by the tsunami, and also helped victims of the Indian Ocean tsunami in December 2004.

Frank Mantooth Jazz Festival
The jazz festival began in 1983 and takes place on the first Saturday of February. Each year, the event brings in around fifty high school and junior high jazz ensembles from the Great Lakes region and Canada to perform during the day. The high school groups attend clinics with jazz educators and composers from around the country. Seminars are also held throughout the day on improvisation, transcription, and music business, as well as instrument masterclasses. A jazz combo and college big band perform in the afternoon, while the evening concert features New Trier's top jazz ensemble and a professional big band. Past groups have included the Buddy Rich Big Band (led by Dave Weckl), the Woody Herman Orchestra, the Count Basie Orchestra, the Artie Shaw Orchestra, the Duke Ellington Orchestra, the Toshiko Akiyoshi-Lew Tabackin Jazz Orchestra, the Vanguard Jazz Orchestra, the Chicago Jazz Ensemble (led by Jon Faddis), the Bob Mintzer Big Band, Gordon Goodwin's Big Phat Band, the Mingus Big Band, Maynard Ferguson, and Dizzy Gillespie. The festival was renamed in 2005 after Frank Mantooth when the jazz musician, educator, and composer died just days before the 2004 festival.

Seminar Day and backlash 
Every year, New Trier holds a seminar day on a topic, with the 2021-2022 school year seminar day being about mental health. In 2017, New Trier held a Seminar day on race. There was significant backlash, especially from conservative publications. For example, the Wall Street Journal ran an article about the day titled "It’s Racial Indoctrination Day at an Upscale Chicagoland School". It is now seen as the beginning to a backlash against so-called "Critical Race Theory" in education.

In the movies
Scenes from Uncle Buck were shot at the high school's west campus in Northfield.

Further reading
The biography , details the life of one of New Trier's founders.

See also

 List of New Trier High School alumni

References

External links

 
 New Trier High School informational publications

Educational institutions established in 1901
Public high schools in Cook County, Illinois
School districts in Cook County, Illinois
Winnetka, Illinois
Northfield, Illinois
Wilmette, Illinois
Glenview, Illinois
1901 establishments in Illinois